"El Beso Que No Le Di" (English: "The Kiss That I Did Not Give") is a song by American singer Romeo Santos with Dominican singer Kiko Rodríguez. It is the ninth single for Santos' fourth studio album Utopía (2019). The music video was released on August 22, 2019. It features Santos and Rodríguez at a church watching as the woman they're in love with is to be married to another man. On October 2, 2020, Santos released a different version by himself as an Amazon Original single.

Charts

Certifications

References 

2019 singles
2019 songs
Bachata songs
Romeo Santos songs
Spanish-language songs
Sony Music Latin singles
Songs written by Romeo Santos
Male vocal duets